Jessie Buckley (born 28 December 1989) is an Irish actress and singer. The recipient of a Laurence Olivier Award, in addition to nominations for an Academy Award and three BAFTA Awards, she was listed at number 38 on The Irish Times list of Ireland's greatest film actors of all time, in 2020. In 2019, she was recognised by Forbes in its annual 30 Under 30 list.

A RADA graduate, Buckley began her career in 2008 as a contestant on the BBC TV talent show I'd Do Anything, in which she came second. Her early onscreen appearances were in BBC television series, such War & Peace (2016) and Taboo (2017). Buckley made her film debut playing the lead role in Beast (2017), and had her breakthrough starring in the musical film Wild Rose (2018). Her performance as an aspiring country music singer in the latter earned her a nomination for the BAFTA Award for Best Actress in a Leading Role.

Buckley's career progressed with starring roles in the HBO miniseries Chernobyl (2019), the thriller film I'm Thinking of Ending Things (2020), season four of Fargo (2020), and the drama The Lost Daughter (2021). Her performance as a troubled mother in the last of these earned her nominations for the BAFTA and Academy Award for Best Supporting Actress. Buckley's portrayal of Sally Bowles in a 2021 West End theatre revival of Cabaret won her the Laurence Olivier Award for Best Actress in a Musical. In 2022, she released the collaborate album For All Our Days That Tear the Heart with Bernard Butler, provided voice acting and performance capture acting for the video game The Dark Pictures Anthology: The Devil in Me, and starred in the films Men and Women Talking.

Early life
Buckley was born on 28 December 1989 in Killarney, County Kerry, the daughter of Marina Cassidy and Tim Buckley. Her mother encouraged her to sing and coached her. She has a younger brother and three younger sisters. She attended Ursuline Secondary School, an all-girls convent school in Thurles, County Tipperary, where her mother works as a vocal coach and where she performed in school productions. She played a number of male roles at school, including the male lead role of Tony in the musical West Side Story and Freddie Trumper in Chess. She reached grade eight in piano, clarinet, and harp at the Royal Irish Academy of Music, and was a member of the Tipperary Millennium Orchestra. She attended summer workshops with the Association of Irish Musical Societies (AIMS) to improve her singing and acting, and it was here that she was recognised as a talented actress and encouraged to apply for drama school in London. Just before she auditioned for I'd Do Anything, she was turned down by two drama schools, including one the day before her first audition for the show. In 2008, she won the AIMS Best Actress award for her portrayal of Julie Jordan in the Killarney Musical Society production of Carousel.

Career

2008–2015: I'd Do Anything and theatrical productions
Buckley began her career as a contestant on I'd Do Anything, a talent show centred on the search for a new, unknown lead to play Nancy in the 2009 West End revival of the British musical Oliver!. She reached the final on 31 May 2008, finishing in second place behind Jodie Prenger. On 26 August 2008, Buckley performed on Denny Street in Tralee, Kerry for RTÉ Radio 1. She followed this with a performance at a charity concert in Tipperary. On 14 September 2008, Buckley performed at an outdoor concert in celebration of Andrew Lloyd Webber's birthday in Hyde Park, London. She gave a solo rendition of "I Don't Know How To Love Him" from Jesus Christ Superstar, and sang "Light at the End of the Tunnel" from Starlight Express with fellow I'd Do Anything finalists Keisha Amponsa-Banson, Niamh Perry, Rachel Tucker, as well as Any Dream Will Do finalists Daniel Boys, Lewis Bradley, Ben James-Ellis and Keith Jack. On 18 September 2008, she and Aoife Mulholland performed with the RTÉ Concert Orchestra at another event held by Lloyd Webber at the National Concert Hall, Dublin. 

Buckley was offered the opportunity to understudy for the role of Nancy, but turned it down in favour of another production. On 10 October 2008, it was announced that Buckley would make her West End debut in a revival of the Stephen Sondheim musical A Little Night Music, in the role of Anne Egerman, at the Menier Chocolate Factory, a fringe Studio Theatre, in London from 22 November 2008 to 8 March 2009. She appeared alongside Maureen Lipman and Hannah Waddingham in the production, which was directed by Trevor Nunn. A Little Night Music transferred from the Menier Chocolate Factory to the Garrick Theatre in London's West End on 7 April 2009. The show closed on 25 July 2009. Since then, she has appeared in a number of concerts nationally, including a Christmas concert alongside Maria Friedman, Cantabile – the London Quartet and Tim Rice, and in February 2010 she appeared alongside Daniel Boys (and Night Music co-star Kelly Price) in a series of Valentine musical concerts.

In January 2013, Buckley graduated from the Royal Academy of Dramatic Art. During Shakespeare's Globe's 2013 summer season, she played Miranda in The Tempest, and singer Arabella Hunt and Kate in Samuel Adamson's Gabriel. In September 2013, Buckley appeared opposite Jude Law in Michael Grandage's West End production of Henry V at the Noël Coward Theatre. She also played Perdita in Kenneth Branagh's theatre company production of The Winter's Tale, which was streamed live to cinemas worldwide on 26 November 2015.

2016–present: Screen career and breakthrough
After an episodic appearance in the detective drama series Endeavour, Buckley portrayed Marya Bolkonskaya in BBC's new dramatisation of War and Peace (2016). She received acclaim for her performance, with Viv Groskop of The Guardian citing her performance as a highlight of episode two, writing that she plays this supposedly plain and pious character "beautifully". Buckley continued her television career with a main role in the drama series Taboo (2017), starring Tom Hardy. She also starred as Honor Martin in BBC One's drama The Last Post (2017), and as Marian Halcombe in the five-part television adaptation of Wilkie Collins' novel The Woman in White (2018).

Buckley made her film debut as Moll Huntford in the psychological thriller Beast (2017), for which she received great acclaim. She then starred in the country music drama Wild Rose (2017), which earned Buckley the opportunity to perform music from the film at the Glastonbury Festival. The official soundtrack from the film reached number one on the UK Country Albums Chart. The film received positive reviews, and her performance was rewarded with a nomination for Best Actress in a Leading Role at the 73rd British Academy Film Awards.

In 2019, Buckley appeared as Lyudmilla Ignatenko in the HBO and Sky UK historical drama mini-series Chernobyl, which revolved around the Chernobyl disaster of 1986 and the clean-up efforts that followed. The five-part series was critically acclaimed, receiving 19 nominations at the 71st Primetime Emmy Awards. Buckley then appeared in the biographical drama Judy, based on the life of American actress Judy Garland. In 2020, she had four releases: Dolittle, directed by Stephen Gaghan, The Courier, directed by Dominic Cooke, Misbehaviour, directed by Philippa Lowthorpe, and the surrealist psychological thriller I'm Thinking of Ending Things, directed by Charlie Kaufman for Netflix. Her performance in the latter was lauded by critics and earned her a nomination for Best Actress at the 30th Annual Gotham Independent Film Awards. The same year, Buckley had a lead role in the fourth season of the FX black comedy crime drama Fargo, where she played nurse Oraetta Mayflower.

In 2021, Buckley starred as the younger version of Leda Caruso in Maggie Gyllenhaal's feature directorial debut The Lost Daughter, with Olivia Colman portraying the character's older counterpart. The film began a theatrical limited release in the United States on 17 December 2021, prior to streaming on Netflix at the end of the month. It received acclaim from critics. Critic Ty Burr believed that Buckley was a "revelation" in the film. For her performance, Buckley won a Gotham Independent Film Award for Outstanding Supporting Performance, and was nominated for a BAFTA Award for Best Actress in a Supporting Role. She also received her first Academy Award nomination for Best Supporting Actress at the 94th Academy Awards.

Buckley was approached by Eddie Redmayne to star alongside him, as Sally Bowles, in a revival of the musical Cabaret. The production opened in the West End in November 2021, and she received the Olivier Award for Best Actress in a Musical in 2022 for her performance.

On 15 April 2022, Buckley and former Suede guitarist Bernard Butler released "The Eagle & The Dove", the lead single from their collaborative album. For All Our Days That Tear the Heart was released on 17 June 2022. It debuted at No. 23 on the UK Albums Chart. The album was shortlisted for the 2022 Mercury Prize.

In 2022, Buckley starred as a widowed woman who travels on holiday to a countryside village in Alex Garland's folk horror film Men, alongside Rory Kinnear. The film was screened at the Cannes Film Festival in the Directors' Fortnight section in May 2022, before being released in the United States on 20 May 2022 by A24. In June 2021, Buckley joined Frances McDormand, Rooney Mara, Claire Foy and Ben Whishaw in the filming of Sarah Polley's feature adaptation of Miriam Toews' bestselling novel Women Talking, with MGM’s Orion Pictures and Plan B Entertainment producing the film. The film began its limited theatrical release in the United States and Canada on 23 December 2022.  In July 2022, Buckley joined Colman, Luke Evans, Jonathan Pryce and Johnny Flynn in Scrooge: A Christmas Carol, an animated rendition of the Charles Dickens' classic, which was released on Netflix in December 2022.

Forthcoming projects
She is committed to star in Rebecca Lenkiewicz's feature directing debut Hot Milk, alongside Fiona Shaw and Vicky Krieps. The film will start shooting in September 2022, in Almería.

In May 2022, it was announced that Buckley would replace Carey Mulligan as the lead in Christos Nikou's English-language feature film debut Fingernails. She is set to reunite with Olivia Colman in Wicked Little Letters, a comedy directed by Thea Sharrock. Principal photography for the project is due to start this autumn in the United Kingdom.

Personal life
Buckley was in a relationship with actor James Norton between 2015 and 2017. She lives in Norfolk as of 2022.

Acting credits

Film

Television

Video games

Theatre

Discography
Collaborative albums
 For All Our Days That Tear the Heart (with Bernard Butler) (2022)

Soundtrack albums
 Wild Rose (2019)

Awards and nominations

References

External links
 Jessie Buckley at the British Film Institute
 
 

1989 births
Living people
Irish women singers
Irish film actresses
Irish musical theatre actresses
Irish Shakespearean actresses
Irish stage actresses
Irish television actresses
Musicians from County Kerry
People from Killarney
Alumni of RADA
Alumni of the Royal Irish Academy of Music
Chopard Trophy for Female Revelation winners